Julie London was an American actress and singer who began her career in film, debuting in Nabonga (1944) before having substantial roles in the horror film The Red House (1947) and the war film Task Force (1949). After beginning a professional singing career in 1955, London occasionally continued to appear in films, including The Girl Can't Help It (1956), in which she performed her signature track, "Cry Me a River". Other roles included in the Western Saddle the Wind (1958) and the drama Night of the Quarter Moon (1959).

Between 1972 and 1978, London portrayed nurse Dixie McCall in the popular NBC series Emergency!, in which she co-starred with her husband, Bobby Troup. In 1974, she received a Golden Globe Award nomination for Best Actress in a Drama Series for her performance in the series' third season. The series marked London's final screen role.

Film

Television

References

Sources

Actress filmographies
American filmographies